Victor Neves Rangel (born 8 September 1990), known as Vitor Rangel, is a Brazilian footballer who plays for CRAC as a forward.

Club career
Born in Serra, Espírito Santo, Rangel made his senior debut with Aracruz in 2011, after a failed trial at Botafogo. After mainly representing clubs in his native state, he moved to Guarani de Palhoça in 2015; he was the tournament's top scorer with 11 goals, despite suffering relegation.

On 19 May 2015 Rangel joined Série A side Grêmio, on loan until the end of the year. He made his debut in the category on 4 June, coming on as a second-half substitute for Pedro Rocha in a 3–1 home win against Corinthians.

Rangel appeared rarely for Tricolor during the campaign, contributing with only 88 minutes of action. On 12 February 2016 he signed for fellow league team América-MG, on loan until the end of the year.

Honours
 América Mineiro
 Campeonato Mineiro: 2016

References

External links

1990 births
Living people
Brazilian footballers
Brazilian expatriate footballers
Sportspeople from Espírito Santo
Association football forwards
Campeonato Brasileiro Série A players
Campeonato Brasileiro Série B players
Esporte Clube Aracruz players
Espírito Santo Sociedade Esportiva players
Vitória Futebol Clube (ES) players
Clube Náutico Marcílio Dias players
Madureira Esporte Clube players
Desportiva Ferroviária players
Guarani de Palhoça players
Grêmio Foot-Ball Porto Alegrense players
América Futebol Clube (MG) players
Esporte Clube Bahia players
Ceará Sporting Club players
Associação Atlética Ponte Preta players
Clube de Regatas Brasil players
Botafogo de Futebol e Regatas players
Santa Cruz Futebol Clube players
Ituano FC players
Brasiliense Futebol Clube players
Joinville Esporte Clube players
Associação Ferroviária de Esportes players
Clube Recreativo e Atlético Catalano players
Ascenso MX players
Cafetaleros de Chiapas footballers
Brazilian expatriate sportspeople in Mexico
Expatriate footballers in Mexico